Soul Mate is a 2002 Italian fantasy-comedy film directed by Sergio Rubini. It is based on the novel with the same name written by Sandro Veronesi. It premiered at the 59th Venice International Film Festival.

Cast 

 Valentina Cervi: Teresa
 Violante Placido: Maddalena
 Michele Venitucci: Tonino
 Sergio Rubini: Angelantonio
 Dino Abbrescia: Alessandro
 Alfredo Minenna: Checco

References

External links

2002 films
Italian fantasy comedy films
Films directed by Sergio Rubini
2000s fantasy comedy films
Films scored by Pino Donaggio
2002 comedy films